Gyaritodes is a genus of longhorn beetles of the subfamily Lamiinae, containing the following species:

 Gyaritodes bispinosus Breuning, 1960
 Gyaritodes inspinosus Breuning, 1947
 Gyaritodes javanicus Breuning, 1963
 Gyaritodes laosensis Breuning, 1963

References

Gyaritini
Taxa named by Stephan von Breuning (entomologist)